Muhammad ibn Ibrahim Junagarhi (also known as Muhammad Junagarhi; 1890-1941) was a British Indian Islamic scholar, muhaddith, author and translator, who co-founded the All-India Ahl-i Hadith Conference, and served as the president of All-India Ahl-i Hadith Conference. He translated Ibn Qayyim's I'laam ul Muwaqqi'een 'an Rabb il 'Aalameen and Ibn Kathir's exegesis of the Quran into Urdu language. Biography 
Muhammad Junagarhi was born in 1890 in the state of Junagadh to Ibrahim and belonged to Memon ethnic group. He was thus known as Muhammad ibn Ibrahim Junagarhi. He completed his early education from the town and later moved to Delhi for higher education. In Delhi, he studied at the Madrasa Aminia. He discontinued his studies at the Aminia and went to Madrasa Darul Kitaba wa- al-Sunnah of Abdul Wahhab Multani, from where he graduated.

Junagarhi co-founded the All-India Ahl-i Hadith Conference and served as the president of the All-India Ahl-i Hadith Conference. He died in 1941 at the age of 64. He was known with the title of Khateeb e Hind. 

 Literary works
Junagarhi translated Tafseer ibn Katheer and Ibn Qayyim's I'laam ul Muwaqqi'een 'an Rabb il 'Aalameen into Urdu language. His other works include:
 Saif-i Muḥammadī Shamʻ-i Muḥammadī Tafseer Ahsanul-Bayan'', a translation of the Quran with commentary by Hafiz Salahuddin Yusuf.

Notes

References

Sources 
 
 

1890 births
1941 deaths
People from Junagadh
Indian Islamic studies scholars
Indian Sunni Muslims
Indian Sunni Muslim scholars of Islam
Hadith scholars
Ahl-i Hadith people